Rafael Enrique Pabon Navedo, better known by his stage name Rafa Pabön, is a Puerto Rican musician known for his urbano songs. In 2019, his single "Pa mí" featuring Dalex charted the top 40 on Hot Latin Songs. On March 2, 2019, the single "Ta To Gucci" by Cauty and Pabón peaked at 58 on the Argentina Hot 100.

In May 2020, Pabón released the single "Mírala" with an accompanying music video directed by Joshua Burgos. In June 2020, he released the protest song and music video, "Sin Aire (Without Air)," in response to the murder of George Floyd, the killing of Eric Garner, police brutality, and racial inequality in the United States.

References

External links
 

Living people
Year of birth missing (living people)
Place of birth missing (living people)
21st-century Puerto Rican musicians
21st-century American male musicians
Urbano musicians
Spanish-language singers